Jan Nawrocki (6 September 1913 – 19 June 2000) was a Polish fencer. He competed at the 1948 and 1952 Summer Olympics.

Family
His sister, Irena Nawrocka, was also an Olympic fencer. She and their first cousin, Halina Dobrowolska (during the war, Halina Korabiowska), served as messengers for Home Army during World War II. The two cousins and three other female Home Army messengers narrowly escaped during a forced march to Ozarow.

References

External links
 

1913 births
2000 deaths
People from Strzyżów County
Polish male fencers
Polish veterinarians
Olympic fencers of Poland
Fencers at the 1948 Summer Olympics
Fencers at the 1952 Summer Olympics
Sportspeople from Podkarpackie Voivodeship
People from the Kingdom of Galicia and Lodomeria
Polish Austro-Hungarians
20th-century Polish people
21st-century Polish people